Myrcenol is an organic compound, specifically a terpenoid. It is most notable as one of the fragrant components of lavender oil.

It is also found in the hop plant (Humulus lupulus). E-Myrcenol acts also as a pheromone for bark beetles.

Role in fragrance industry 
Myrcenol is obtained synthetically from myrcene via hydroamination of the 1,3-diene followed by hydrolysis and Pd-catalysed removal of the amine. As a 1,3-diene, myrcenol undergoes Diels-Alder reactions with several dienophiles such as acrolein to give cyclohexene derivatives that are also useful fragrances.

References 

Flavors
Pheromones
Tertiary alcohols
Monoterpenes
Dienes